Mark Zubek (born June 19, 1974) is a songwriter, and jazz musician.  His songwriting style is influenced by gangsta rap, grunge, death metal, and acid jazz. He was discovered by Betty Carter, who wrote lyrics for and performed a composition of his.

Zubek was a member of the Toronto Songwriters' Association and has written jingles for companies like Coca-Cola, Dunkin' Donuts and the Discovery Channel.

Zubek writes and produces albums for singers and bands, arranges, plays instruments, and does sound engineering from his home studio.

Discography

As leader
Zubek has two solo jazz records out on Fresh Sound Records: "Horse With a Broken Leg" (2000) and "twentytwodollarfishlunch" (2009).

Additional information

Reviews
All About Jazz Magazine:  Toronto-based bass player, songwriter, and producer Mark Zubek epitomizes his many cross-genres skills in the fields of jazz, hip-hop, R&B, and pop.  Zubek's compositions revolve around his propulsive playing and the fat sound of his upright bass. Zubek's impressive vision and original compositions succeeds in blurring the artificial boundaries between jazz and other popular genres.

The All Music Guide says that Zubek gets a remarkably fat, woody sound from his instrument

Jazz Times Magazine 2009:  Well crafted with a definite edge...like the 21st century Jazz Messengers...this is punk-jazz for now people.

References

1974 births
Canadian jazz double-bassists
Male double-bassists
Canadian record producers
Living people
Musicians from Mississauga
21st-century double-bassists
21st-century Canadian male musicians
Canadian male jazz musicians